Herodian (c. 170 – c. 240) was a Roman civil servant who wrote History of the Empire from the Death of Marcus.

Herodian may also refer to:
 Aelius Herodianus, grammarian
 Herodian dynasty, a royal dynasty of Idumaean (Edomite) descent
 Herodian Kingdom of Judea, a client state of the Roman Republic from 37 BCE to 4 BCE
 Herodian Tetrarchy, 4 BCE to 44 CE
 Herodian of Patras, one of the Seventy Disciples and bishop of Patras
 Herodians, a sect of Hellenistic Jews mentioned in the New Testament

See also
 
 Herod (disambiguation)